2011–12 Albanian Cup was the sixtieth season of Albania's annual cup competition. The winners of the competition qualified for the first qualifying round of the 2012–13 UEFA Europa League. KF Tirana are the defending champions, having won their 14th Albanian Cup last season.

Except of Second Round and Quarter Finals, the rest of stages were played in a two-legged format similar to those of European competitions. If the aggregated score was tied after both games, the team with the higher number of away goals advanced. If the number of away goals was equal in both games, the match was decided by extra time and a penalty shootout, if necessary.

Preliminary Tournament
In order to reduce the number of participating teams for the First Round to 32, a preliminary tournament was played. Only teams from the Second Division (third level) were allowed to enter. Each Second Division group played its own tournament. In contrast to the main tournament, the preliminary tournament was held as a single-leg knock-out competition.

First Preliminary Round
These matches took place on 6 September 2011.

Second Preliminary Round
These matches took place on 13 September 2011.

First round
All 30 teams of the 2011–12 Superliga and First Division entered in this round along with the two qualifiers from the Second Preliminary Round. The first legs were played on 21 September 2011 and the second legs took place on 27 September 2011.

Second round
In a change from last year's format, this stage of the competition will be played as a group stage. The 16 winners from the First Round will be placed in 4 groups of 4 teams each. Each group will play a double round robin schedule for a total of 6 games for each team. The top 2 teams in each groups will move on to the next round of the competition. These matches took place between 18 October and 20 December 2011.

Group A

Group B

Group C

Group D

Quarter-finals

The 8 winners from the Second Round will be placed in 2 groups of 4 teams each. Each group will play a double round robin schedule for a total of 6 games for each team. The top 2 teams in each groups will move on to the next round of the competition. These matches took place between 28 January and 20 March 2012.

Group 1

Group 2

Semi-finals
The four winners from the Quarterfinals will compete in this round. These matches took place on 4 and 18 April 2012.

Final
The two winners from the Semifinals will compete in this round. The final match took place on 17 May 2012 at Qemal Stafa Stadium in Tirana.

References

External links
 Official website 
 Albanian Cup at soccerway.com

Cup
2011–12 domestic association football cups
2011-12